Group B of the 2012 Fed Cup Asia/Oceania Zone Group I was one of four pools in the Asia/Oceania zone of the 2012 Fed Cup. Three teams competed in a round robin competition, with the top team and the bottom team proceeding to their respective sections of the play-offs: the top team played for advancement to the World Group II Play-offs, while the bottom team faced potential relegation to Group II.

Thailand vs. Indonesia

Kazakhstan vs. South Korea

Kazakhstan vs. Indonesia

Thailand vs. South Korea

Thailand vs. Kazakhstan

South Korea vs. Indonesia

References

External links
 Fed Cup website

2012 Fed Cup Asia/Oceania Zone